The La Lanzada beach (praia da Lanzada in Galician) is one of the most famous beaches in Galicia (Spain). It is located in the municipalities of O Grove and Sanxenxo in the province of Pontevedra. The blue flag has been flying there for a long time.

Description 
It is located on the southwestern side of the isthmus that connects the O Grove peninsula to the mainland. It is located near the entrance to the ria of Pontevedra and the northern end of the isthmus borders the mouth of the ria of Arosa. Its northern end is close to the tourist village of San Vicente del Mar (O Grove).

The Lanzada is a very large beach: it is 2.5 kilometres long and more than three kilometres if the adjacent beaches of Areas Gordas and Lapa are included. It is the fourth longest beach in Galicia. Its different parts are given 3 names:

 Areas Gordas (Coarse sands)
 Lapa Beach (Limpet Beach)
 Lanzada Beach (Pier Beach)

It is one of the most famous and extensive beaches in Galicia. During the summer, many tourists come to visit it.

It is surrounded by a beautiful natural environment protected by dunes belonging to the Natura 2000 network. Currently, the dunes are a protected ecosystem.

Activities 
On this open sea beach, the sea is often rough, which is why sports such as surfing and windsurfing can be practiced. Kiteboarding is also practised here, as it is an open sea beach that can become very windy.

Places of interest such as the Lanzada Tower, the Castro de la Lanzada and the chapel of Our Lady of the Lanzada are only a few metres away.

Access 
From Pontevedra or Sanxenxo, it can be reached via the PO-308 road to O Grove.

The quickest way to get there is via the Salnés Motorway, AG-41, which is reached by taking the last exit towards O Grove.

Gallery

See also

Related articles 
 Ria de Pontevedra
 Province of Pontevedra
 Rías Baixas
 Montalvo Beach
 Sanxenxo
 O Grove

References

External links 
 
 

Tourism in Galicia (Spain)
Province of Pontevedra
Beaches of Spain
Beaches of Galicia (Spain)
Tourist attractions in Galicia (Spain)
Pontevedra